The Watchtower of El Vellón (Spanish: Atalaya de El Vellón) is a watchtower located in El Vellón, Spain. It was declared Bien de Interés Cultural in 1983.

References 

Towers in Spain
Castles in the Community of Madrid
Bien de Interés Cultural landmarks in the Community of Madrid